Kim Dae-won may refer to:
Kim Dae-won (footballer, born 1992)
Kim Dae-won (footballer, born 1997)